Adnan Mohammad Yaqoob (born July 2 1996) is a professional footballer who plays as a winger for VB 1968. He previously played for Lyngby BK, FC Nordsjælland and Norwegian club Arendal. Born in Denmark, he represents Pakistan at international level

Club career

Nordsjælland
Mohammad was permanently moved to the first team squad in the summer 2015, at the age of 18 and got his contract extended.

On 27 September 2015, Mohammad got his Superliga debut in a match against AGF, who FCN won 2–0, where he came on the pitch in the 85th minute, replacing Marcus Ingvartsen.

Arendal
After only 11 league games for FCN, Mohammad moved to the Norwegian club Arendal on 30 March 2017.

Mohammad played his first match for the club on 9 April 2017 against Ull/Kisa. After only 3 months, his contract was terminated and Mohammad revealed, that he found it hard to settle down in a new country and that he wanted to get back to Denmark.

Helsingør
On 13 July 2017, Mohammad signed for newly promoted Danish Superliga-side FC Helsingør.

Lyngby
On 1 September 2018, Lyngby Boldklub announced the signing of Mohammad on a four-year deal. He reached promotion to the Danish Superliga during his first season at the club.

Gambling addiction and contract termination
On 19 November 2019, with three years left of his contract, Lyngby announced that Mohammad would leave the club at the end of the year by mutual agreement due to personal reasons. In January 2020 it was revealed that Mohammad had borrowed money from several teammates in order to cover his betting debt, which was the reasons behind him being released by Lyngby. Mohammad had borrowed such a big sum, that he could not recompense them, which caused the rest of the team to turn against him. Furthermore, Lyngby's head coach, Christian Nielsen, had loaned him 5500 DKK and Mohammad had also contacted younger players in the squad via social medias, asking to borrow money. One of the youth players had allegedly borrowed him around 50.000 DKK, after Mohammad had claimed that he was going to use the money to pay for a wedding.

In February 2020, Mohammad participated in a mini-documentary about his release and gambling addiction, where he said: My life is ruined. You can't get any deeper than this, but it's my own fault. I don't want pity from people because I've cheated them and lied to them, but I'm going to make up for it if I just get a second chance and get my career going again. Mohammad also said that at the moment, there had been no interest for him from any other clubs and that he agreed to part ways with Lyngby, even though he had the right to stay for the last three years of the contract.

Later career
On 3 March 2019, Ishøj IF from the Denmark Series confirmed, that Mohammad had signed for the club. Mohammad had been training with the club since his departure from Lyngby. In the summer 2021, he joined fellow league club GVI. 

However, already two months later - on 1 September 2021 - Mohammad joined KFUM Roskilde. On 2 March 2022, the club confirmed that they had terminated Mohammad's contract after failing to get him fit since his arrival.

On 11 March 2022, Mohammad signed with VB 1968.

International career
Adnan Mohammad was selected by Pakistan national football team for 2018 SAFF Championship but couldn't feature because his visa was not issued by the Bangladeshi authorities. But he finally made his debut for the national team on November 16, 2018 in a 2 - 1 friendly loss against Palestine in which he assisted the only goal scored by Hassan Bashir.

Career statistics

References

External links
 

1996 births
Living people
Footballers from Copenhagen
Pakistani footballers
Pakistan international footballers
Danish men's footballers
Danish expatriate men's footballers
Danish people of Pakistani descent
Danish Superliga players
Danish 1st Division players
Norwegian First Division players
FC Nordsjælland players
FC Helsingør players
Lyngby Boldklub players
Arendal Fotball players
Association football forwards
Ishøj IF players
KFUM Roskilde players
Denmark Series players
Pakistani expatriate sportspeople in Norway
Danish expatriate sportspeople in Norway
Expatriate footballers in Norway
Pakistani expatriate footballers
Sportspeople involved in betting scandals